Filip Chlup (born 10 June 1985) is a Czech professional footballer who played as a midfielder for 1. FC Brno. He formerly played for RBC Roosendaal.

External links
 
  Voetbal International

1985 births
Living people
Czech footballers
Czech First League players
FC Zbrojovka Brno players
RBC Roosendaal players
Association football midfielders
People from Vyškov
Czech Republic youth international footballers
Sportspeople from the South Moravian Region